This list of botanical gardens and arboretums in Florida is intended to include all significant botanical gardens and arboretums in the U.S. state of Florida

See also
List of botanical gardens and the city is a great  gardens and arboretums in the United States

References 

 
Arboreta in Florida
botanical gardens and arboretums in Florida